In mathematics, and especially differential geometry, the Quillen metric is a metric on the determinant line bundle of a family of operators. It was introduced by Daniel Quillen for certain elliptic operators over a Riemann surface, and generalized to higher-dimensional manifolds by Jean-Michel Bismut and Dan Freed.

The Quillen metric was used by Quillen to give a differential-geometric interpretation of the ample line bundle over the moduli space of vector bundles on a compact Riemann surface, known as the Quillen determinant line bundle. It can be seen as defining the Chern–Weil representative of the first Chern class of this ample line bundle. The Quillen metric construction and its generalizations were used by Bismut and Freed to compute the holonomy of certain determinant line bundles of Dirac operators, and this holonomy is associated to certain anomaly cancellations in Chern–Simons theory predicted by Edward Witten. 

The Quillen metric was also used by Simon Donaldson in 1987 in a new inductive proof of the Hitchin–Kobayashi correspondence for projective algebraic manifolds, published one year after the resolution of the correspondence by Shing-Tung Yau and Karen Uhlenbeck for arbitrary compact Kähler manifolds.

Determinant line bundle of a family of operators

Since each of these operators is Fredholm, the kernel and cokernel are finite-dimensional. Thus there are assignments

However, the index of a differential operator, the dimension of the kernel subtracted by the dimension of the cokernel, is an invariant up to continuous deformations. That is, the assignment

Since it is not possible to take a difference of vector bundles, it is not possible to combine the families of kernels and cokernels of  into a vector bundle.

This virtual index bundle contains information about the analytical properties of the family , and its virtual rank, the difference of dimensions, may be computed using the Atiyah–Singer index theorem, provided the operators  are elliptic differential operators.

One defines the determinant line bundle of the family  as the fibrewise determinant of the virtual index bundle,

which over each  has fibre given by the determinant line . This genuine line bundle over the topological space  has the same first Chern class as the virtual index bundle, and this may be computed from the index theorem.

Quillen metric

The Quillen metric was introduced by Quillen, and is a Hermitian metric on the determinant line bundle of a certain family of differential operators parametrised by the space of unitary connections on a complex vector bundle over a compact Riemann surface. In this section the construction is sketched.

These combine to give a Hermitian inner product,  say, on the determinant line , a one-dimensional complex vector space. However, when one has a family  of such operators parametrised by a smooth manifold , the assignment  of Hermitian inner products on each fibre of the determinant line bundle  does not define a smooth Hermitian metric.

The natural Hermitian metrics  may develop singular behaviour whenever the eigenvalues  of the Laplacian operators  cross or become equal, combining smaller eigenspaces into larger eigenspaces. In order to cancel out this singular behaviour, one must regularise the Hermitian metric  by multiplying by an infinite determinant

This zeta function and infinite determinant is intimately related to the analytic torsion of the Laplacian . In the general setting studied by Bismut and Freed, some care needs to be taken in the definition of this infinite determinant, which is defined in terms of a supertrace.

Quillen's construction produces a metric on the determinant line bundle of this family, and Quillen showed that the curvature form of the Chern connection associated to the Quillen metric is given by the Atiyah–Bott symplectic form on the space of unitary connections, previously discovered by Michael Atiyah and Raoul Bott in their study of the Yang–Mills equations over Riemann surfaces.

Curvature 

Associated to the Quillen metric and its generalised construction by Bismut and Freed is a unitary connection, and to this unitary connection is associated its curvature form. The associated cohomology class of this curvature form is predicted by the families version of the Atiyah–Singer index theorem, and the agreement of this prediction with the curvature form was proven by Bismut and Freed. In the setting of Riemann surfaces studied by Quillen, this curvature is shown to be given by

This symplectic form is the Atiyah–Bott symplectic form first discovered by Atiyah and Bott.

In Donaldson's new proof of the Hitchin–Kobayashi correspondence for projective algebraic manifolds, he explained how to construct a determinant line bundle over the space of unitary connections on a vector bundle over an arbitrary algebraic manifold which has the higher-dimensional Atiyah–Bott symplectic form as its curvature:

where  is a projective algebraic manifold. This construction was used by Donaldson in an inductive proof of the correspondence.

Generalisations and alternate notions 

The Quillen metric is primarily considered in the study of holomorphic vector bundles over Riemann surfaces or higher dimensional complex manifolds, and in Bismut and Freeds generalisation to the study of families of elliptic operators. In the study of moduli spaces of algebraic varieties and complex manifolds, it is possible to construct determinant line bundles on the space of almost-complex structures on a fixed smooth manifold  which induce a Kähler structure with form . Just as the Quillen metric for vector bundles was related to the stability of vector bundles in the work of Atiyah and Bott and Donaldson, one may relate the Quillen metric for the determinant bundle for manifolds to the stability theory of manifolds. Indeed the K-energy functional defined by Toshiki Mabuchi, which has critical points given by constant scalar curvature Kähler metrics, can be interpreted as the log-norm functional for a Quillen metric on the space of Kähler metrics.

References

Differential geometry